"The Galway Races" is a traditional Irish song. The song's narrator is attending the eponymous annual event in Galway, a city in the west of Ireland. The song was made famous in the UK in 1967 by The Dubliners.

Recordings
"The Galway Races" has been recorded by a variety of artists, including:

 Jim McCann on the album The Craic Is 90
 Liam Clancy on the album Liam Clancy
 The Clancy Brothers on the albums Isn't It Grand Boys and Wrap the Green Flag
 Tommy Makem and Liam Clancy on the album Live at the National Concert Hall
 The Dubliners, on multiple albums
 The Wolfe Tones, on The Foggy Dew (1965) 
 Paddy Reilly, on multiple albums
 The Chieftains, on the album Ballad of the Irish Horse
 The Pogues on the album If I Should Fall From Grace With God
Todd Menton on the album Punts (2003)
 Patrick Clifford on the album American Wake

External links 

Lyrics
The Traditional Ballad Index

Folk ballads
Irish folk songs
The Dubliners songs
The Pogues songs
Year of song unknown
Songwriter unknown